The 2009 NASCAR Canadian Tire Series is the third racing season since the buy out of the CASCAR Super Series.

Highlights
The 2009 calendar is highlighted with a race added to Saskatchewan at the Auto Clearing Motor Speedway, a return to Delaware Speedway and the dates at Cayuga, Ontario removed. Important car changes are Joey Hanssen came from the Netherlands to run a second D. J. Kennington's car, J. R. Fitzpatrick has graduated to NASCAR Camping World Truck Series and will only run part-time and as well as American NASCAR star Cale Gale will run a couple of races. Again all of the races will air on TSN on tape delay. The 2009 season will be David Whitlock's last season as he started it off great with a win in Quebec. Formula One driver Jacques Villeneuve made his series debut in the Tide 250 (4th race of the year) finishing last after wrecking out on the 1st lap where Scott Steckly went to victory lane. During the western road swing of races Andrew Ranger won two of the three taking the points lead with Steckly picking up the 3rd and the first ever race in Saskatchewan. Ranger then went on to win the next two races. Montreal is the most famed race, as it is paired with the NASCAR Nationwide Series. R. Fitzpatrick picking up his first win of the season. At the end of the season Don Thomson Jr. finally won after a disappointing first half of the year at Barrie Speedway. Andrew Ranger ended up getting his 6th win of 13 and locking up the championship with a win at Riverside Speedway on September 20, 2009. The final weekend of racing took place at Kawartha Speedway where D. J. Kennington picked up his second win of the season. The race was delayed many times and was run on Sunday instead of Saturday due to rain. Andrew Ranger won his second championship in three years with the biggest points margin in series history. He will be eligible for the Toyota All-Star Shootout in January, looking to expand his NASCAR career to the next level. The 2009 Rookie of the year was Joey Hanssen, who beat out Dexter Stacey.

Teams and drivers

Schedule and results

 * - Set by owners points** - Race was rained out, ran the next day.

Points standings

Driver standings

The top 10

See also
2009 NASCAR Sprint Cup Series
2009 NASCAR Nationwide Series
2009 NASCAR Camping World Truck Series
2009 NASCAR Camping World East Series
2009 NASCAR Camping World West Series
2009 NASCAR Corona Series
2009 NASCAR Mini Stock Series

References
 Official Website

External links
Canadian Tire Series Standings and Statistics for 2009

NASCAR Canadian Tire Series season

NASCAR Pinty's Series